Chang Pin-cheng (born 3 March 1937) is a Taiwanese boxer. He competed in the men's light welterweight event at the 1964 Summer Olympics.

References

1937 births
Living people
Taiwanese male boxers
Olympic boxers of Taiwan
Boxers at the 1964 Summer Olympics
Place of birth missing (living people)
Light-welterweight boxers
20th-century Taiwanese people